20th Century Masters – The Millennium Collection: The Best of Parliament is a compilation album by the American Funk band Parliament released in 2000 as part Universal Music's "Millennium Collection" series. 20th Century Masters uses eight of the ten songs from Parliament's Greatest Hits (1984), and is essentially an update of that collection. Album versions of the songs "Up for the Down Stroke"; "Mothership Connection (Star Child)" and "Aqua Boogie" are also used in place of the edited versions used on Greatest Hits.

Track listing

"P-Funk (Wants to Get Funked Up)" (Clinton, Worrell, Collins) 7:40
"Give Up the Funk (Tear the Roof off the Sucker)" (Clinton, Collins, Brailey) 5:45
"Flash Light" (Clinton, Worrell, Collins) 5:47
"Dr. Funkenstein" (Clinton, Collins, Worrell) – 5:43
"Up for the Down Stroke" (Clinton, Collins, Worrell, Haskins) 5:07
"Chocolate City" (Clinton, Collins, Worrell) 5:36
"Bop Gun (Endangered Species)" (Clinton, Collins, Shider) 8:28
"Testify" (Clinton, Taylor) 4:04
"Aqua Boogie (A Psychoalphadiscobetabioaquadoloop)" (Clinton, Collins, Worrell) 6:42
"Mothership Connection (Star Child)" (Clinton, Collins, Worrell) 6:13
"Agony of Defeet" (Dunbar, Sterling, Clinton) 6:25

References

Parliament (band) compilation albums
Parliament
2000 compilation albums
Mercury Records compilation albums